Angela Dale  (born 1945) is a British social scientist and statistician whose research has involved the secondary analysis of government survey data, and the study of women in the workforce. Formerly Deputy Director of the Social Statistics Research Unit of City, University of London, and  Professor of Quantitative Research and Director of the Cathie Marsh Centre for Census and Survey Research at the University of Manchester, she is now a professor emerita at Manchester.

Selected publications
Dale is an author of the books; 
Doing Secondary Analysis: A Practical Guide (with Sara Arber and Michael Proctor, Unwin Hyman, 1988)
Analyzing Census Microdata (with Ed Fieldhouse and Claire Holdsworth, Edward Arnold, 2000)

She is an editor of
The 1991 Census User's Guide (edited with Cathie Marsh, HMSO 1993)
Analysing Social and Political Change: A Casebook of Methods (with Richard B. Davies, Sage, 1994)
The Gender Dimension of Social Change: The Contribution of Dynamic Research to the Study of Women's Life Courses (with Elisabetta Ruspini, Policy Press, 2002)
Understanding Social Research: Thinking Creatively about Method (with Jennifer Mason, Sage, 2011)

She has also published highly cited journal papers on women in the workforce including

Recognition
Dale is a Fellow of the Academy of Social Sciences. She was named to the Order of the British Empire in the 2006 New Year Honours "for services to social science". In 2006, Dale won the West Medal of the Royal Statistical Society, given "for outstanding contributions to the development or communication of official statistics".

References

1945 births
Living people
British statisticians
Women statisticians
Academics of City, University of London
Academics of the University of Manchester
Officers of the Order of the British Empire
Fellows of the Academy of Social Sciences